Mokrousovo is a rural locality (a selo) and the administrative center of Mokrousovsky District, Kurgan Oblast, Russia. Population:

References

Notes

Sources

Rural localities in Kurgan Oblast
Yalutorovsky Uyezd
Mokrousovsky District